Ashab Uddin (Born: 28 October 1958) is a Retired Major General of Bangladesh Army. He has also served as Bangladesh's ambassador to Kuwait and Yemen.

Early life 
Ashab Uddin was born on 28 October 1956 in Matijura village of Tilpara union in Beanibazar, Sylhet. He married Farha Asab Chowdhury on 29 February 1988. The couple has a daughter, Faria, and a son, Farhan.

He passed SSC and HSC from Faujdarhat Cadet College. He graduated from University of Chittagong. He holds postgraduate and postgraduate defense studies from the Department of Political Science at the National University. He holds a Master's degree in National and International Strategic Studies (MPhil) from the University of Madras, India.

He completed several courses, including a military science course at the Defence Services Command and Staff College and an army staff course in Pakistan. He completed the reserve component in 1996, the special forces operation in 2003, and the senior executive course in the United States in 2008.

Career 
Ashab Uddin was commissioned in the Bangladesh Army in 1979 in the first regular batch. He was commanding two infantry battalions, two infantry brigades and general officer commanding (GOC) of two infantry divisions and Savar and Chittagong area commanders. He was also the Director Military Training and Commandant of the Defence Services Command and Staff College. He retired from the Bangladesh Army in 2013.

He served as the Ambassador of Bangladesh to the Embassy in Kuwait and Yemen from 17 September 2013 to 2016. He is also the President of Bangladesh Shooting Sports Federation and Bhatiary Golf & Country Club of Savar.

UN mission 
He has taken part in UN peacekeeping operations in Mozambique as a peacekeeper.

Award 

 United Nations Peacekeeping Medal

References 

Living people
1958 births
Bangladesh Army generals
Bangladeshi military personnel
Ambassadors of Bangladesh to Kuwait
Ambassadors of Bangladesh to Yemen
Faujdarhat Cadet College alumni
National University, Bangladesh alumni
University of Chittagong alumni
University of Madras alumni
People from Beanibazar Upazila